Néstor Rafael "Che" García (born 11 January 1965) is an Argentine professional basketball coach.

Head coaching career

Latin American clubs
García won the 3rd-tier South American Club Championship in 2008, with Club Biguá de Villa Biarritz. He also won the 1st-tier FIBA Americas League championship in 2016, with Guaros de Lara.

National teams
García coached the Uruguay national team in 2003. He also coached the Argentina national team at the 2012 South American Championship, where they won a gold medal. He has also coached the senior men's Venezuela national team.

As the head coach of Venezuela, he won the gold medal at the 2014 South American Championship, the gold medal at the 2015 FIBA Americas Championship, and the gold medal at the 2016 South American Championship. He also coached Venezuela at the 2016 Summer Olympics.

In 2019, Garcia was hired as head coach of the Dominican Republic national team, where he took the helm prior to their entrance into the 2019 FIBA World Cup.

In 2021, Garcia was reappointed as head coach of the Argentina national team. However, Garcia was abruptly let go a year later, prior to Argentina's arrival at the 2022 FIBA AmeriCup tournament. In September 2022, Garcia reappeared as head coach of the Dominican Republic national team.

European clubs
On 6 July 2017, García went to Spain, and agreed on a one-year contract term with Montakit Fuenlabrada. This marked the first European club that he worked in as a head coach. After parting ways with the club at the end of the 2017–18 season, he came back to the club in October 2018, in order to replace Agustí Julbe.

References

External links
Spanish League Profile 
Néstor García dirigirá en Arabia Saudita 
Néstor García dirigirá a Argentino 

1965 births
Living people
Sportspeople from Bahía Blanca
Argentine basketball coaches
Argentine expatriate basketball people in Brazil
Argentine expatriate basketball people in Puerto Rico
Argentine expatriate basketball people in Spain
Argentine expatriate basketball people in Uruguay
Argentine expatriate basketball people in Colombia
Argentine expatriate basketball people in Saudi Arabia
Argentine expatriate basketball people in Venezuela
Baloncesto Fuenlabrada coaches
Guaros de Lara basketball coaches
Minas Tênis Clube basketball coaches
Argentine expatriate basketball people in the Dominican Republic